The parishes of Jersey are the civil and religious administrative districts of Jersey in the Channel Islands. All have access to the sea and share a name with their ancient parish churches. The parishes and roles within them are based on ancient Jersey law, drawing from the Norman customary law system. As such, many of the parish roles and structures have often been ill-defined.

History

Names 
Eleven of the twelve parishes are named for the saint of their parish church. The remaining parish's church does not have a saint, but the parish is still named for its church. Such uniform naming would be fairly unusual for parishes in England.

In Jèrriais, the parishes have named groupings: the northern parishes are called  (uphill parishes) and the southern and western parishes are called  (sloped parishes).

Origins 
The origins of the Jersey parishes is unknown, however it is certain that they are ancient institutions. It has been suggested that the five central parishes (St Saviour, St John, St Mary, St Peter and St Lawrence) date to around 475 AD.

The parish system is much more important in Jersey than in England or post-Napoleon France.:15 The uniformity of the parishes in size ensured their dominance over the feudal boundaries. The uniformity may in fact be designed out of a reorganisation of the Diocese of Coutances in the twelfth century by Archbishop Geoffrey de Montbrai, following Viking raids of the islands. The new boundaries paid little heed to the fiefs or to geographical factors (hence why Gorey and St. Aubin are not parish centres, despite being populated). By Norman times, the parish boundaries were firmly fixed and remain largely unchanged since. It was likely set in place due to the tithe system under Charlemagne, where each property must contribute to the church, so each property would have had to be established within a parish. 

Although in France the role of the parishes remained strictly ecclesiastical, in Jersey the parishes adopted a role in secular administration as well. For example, there is the ancient practice of  - the recording of contracts, court decisions and legislation by the parishes. In 1545, the States set up a system of districts based on parish boundaries for defensive purposes. This started the relationship between the parish and the military.

The  were the wealthier parishioners and were eligible to rule the parishes. The criteria to be considered a  differed by parish and was determined by the amount of rate paid on property. 

Gorroic is an old spelling for Gorey, containing St Martin, St Saviour, Grouville and St Clement; Groceio could derive from de Gruchy, and contains St John, Trinity, St Lawrence and St Helier; and Crapoudoit, likely referring to the stream of St Peter's Valley, contains the remainder of the parishes in the West. This was a time of building or extending churches with most parish churches in the island being built/rebuilt in a Norman style chosen by the abbey or priory to which each church had been granted. St Mary and St Martin being given to Cerisy Abbey.

In 1496, Henry VII bribed the Pope to allow Jersey to be moved from the diocese of Coutances to Westminster. The Reformation arrived in Jersey from France, making Calvinism rather than Anglicanism as the major form of Protestantism in Jersey. Due to Jersey's self-governance and the distinctive parish structure in Jersey, the Crown allowed Calvinism to establish itself in Jersey until 1620. This form of Christianity privileged the position of the parish generally, which maintained and boosted the role of the parish within the country's cultural mindset and political structure.

Reform 
In the 19th century, the Church of England experienced a reduction in its role in civil affairs, including within the parishes. The codification of the island's laws and subsequent reforms, brought on by the popularity of Nonconformism and the acceptance of religious pluralism, re-distributed the balance of power between the civil and religious parts of the parishes. Nevertheless, the offices of the parish were still closely related to the Church, so Nonconformists were generally excluded from parish roles.

Geography 
The boundaries of the parishes rarely share the same boundaries as the ancient fiefs of Jersey. The parishes do not all have nucleated settlements around villages.

List of parishes

Culture
Each parish has a visual identity in the form of a parish crest, which are present on some street signs. These were created for the visit of George V in 1921. Each parish also has a day, normally the feast day of the parish patron saint (for this reason Grouville and St Martin share a day, as they share a patron saint).

Municipal structure

In order to maintain the historic ties to the Church of England there is a Rectorate comprising the Connétable and Procureurs, and the Rector and Churchwardens. Oversees the operation of the largest church within the parochial boundary.

Connétable

Each parish is headed by a Connétable (English: Constable; Jèrriais: Connêtabl'ye) who is elected for a four-year period by the residents of the parish. In 2018, eleven of the twelve Connétables were re-elected unopposed. Connétables have the right ex officio to be members of the States Assembly.

The Connétables of all 12 parishes meet at the Comité des Connétables to discuss matters that affect all parishes, such as rates.

Procureur du Bien Public
The Procureur du Bien Public (two in each parish) is the legal and financial representative of the parish (elected at a public election since 2003 in accordance with the Public Elections (Amendment) (Jersey) Law 2003; formerly an Assembly of Electors of each parish elected the procureurs in accordance with the Loi (1804) au sujet des assemblées paroissiales). A Procureur du Bien Public is elected for a mandate of three years as a public trustee for the funds and property of the parish and is empowered to enter into contracts on behalf of the parish if so authorised by a Parish Assembly.

Centeniers are elected at a public election within each parish for a term of three years to undertake policing within the parish. The centenier is the only officer authorised to charge and bail offenders. Formerly, the senior centenier of each parish (known as the Chef de Police) was the Constable's deputy in the States of Jersey when the Constable was unable to attend a sitting of the States — this function has been abolished.

Roads Committee
A Roads Committee of five elected principals is also available to offer advice on a range of issues; chiefly related to the roads. Centeniers are the highest ranking police officers in Jersey and are elected.

In Jersey, the Roads Committee (French: Comité des Chemins) is the highway authority for parish roads in each parish. In accordance with the Loi (1914) sur la Voirie it superintends the repair and maintenance of by-roads in the parish, establishes boundary stones, issues Choses Publiques licenses, examines planning applications that fall within its responsibilities, supervises refuse collection, adjudicates fines during the Visite du Branchage, and proposes new road names, as may be necessary, for approval by the Parish Assembly. The Connétable presides over the Roads Committee, which also includes the Rector and three Principals of the Parish [five Principals for St Helier] elected for a term of three years by the Parish Assembly.

Instructions are passed to Roads Inspectors whose duty it is to ensure that the repairs are carried out.

In St Helier, the larger Roads Committee also undertakes additional non-statutory responsibilities with regard to parks and other matters, and acts, in the absence of a municipal council, as an advisory body to the Connétable. By convention, the two Procureurs du Bien Public of St Helier attend meetings of the Roads Committee, but cannot vote.

Vingtaines
The Parish is further divided into Vingtaines (Jèrriais: Vîngt'nyi) (or, in St Ouen, Cueillettes). Each vingtaine is represented by two Vingteniers, two Roads Inspectors and three Constable's Officers. All are elected and sworn officers of the Royal Court.

Honorary Police

There is an Honorary Police (French: Police honorifique) force in each parish in Jersey. Honorary Police officers have, for centuries, been elected by parishioners to assist the Connétable of the Parish to maintain law and order. Officers are elected as Centeniers, Vingteniers or Constable's Officers each with various duties and responsibilities.

The Honorary Police provided the only law enforcement prior to the appointment of paid police officers for the Parish of St Helier in 1853 and later to serve the whole Island. The Honorary Police still provide an essential and very valuable service to the parish and community. These officers are elected for a period of three years and take an oath in the Royal Court.

All Honorary Police officers must live in the Parish at the time of their first election or, in the case of St Helier, be a ratepayer or mandataire of that Parish. If an officer moves out of the Parish during her/his term of office, they may continue their term of office with the approval of the Attorney General and the Connétable of the Parish and may stand for re-election provided there is no break in service.

A person may be nominated for election as a member of the Honorary Police if, on the day of nomination, they are at least 20 years of age and less than 70 years of age. Honorary Police officers are on duty for one week at a time, usually every 3 or 4 weeks depending upon the roster within the Parish, and are on call 24 hours a day during that period. Honorary Police officers are elected to serve the Parish but in certain circumstances may assist or operate outside the Parish. Anyone standing for election as a member of the Honorary Police will have to undergo a criminal record check.

Roads Inspectors
The Parish Assembly elects two Roads Inspectors for each Vingtaine [or Cueillette in St Ouen] for a three-year term of office in accordance with the Loi (1914) sur la Voirie. Roads Inspectors are responsible for the repair of by-roads of the Parish and have to ensure the instructions of the Roads Committee are carried out.

Their chief role is the annual Visite du Branchage and the triennial Visite Royale. In the Parish of St Helier, the Roads Inspectors also undertake additional non-statutory responsibilities with regard to the policing of infractions of the Road Traffic Act (Jersey) and other areas of the law within the parochial remit such as dog licensing and fly posting. They also serve as conduits of information to the Honorary Police. Supplementary bodies are also elected to serve specific needs; in the largest parish St Helier these include; the Accounts Committee, the Welfare Board, and the Youth Council. Matters of import are brought before a gathering of the municipality and members of the public for consideration and vote.

Parish Assembly
A Parish Assembly in Jersey is the decision-making body of local government, comprising ratepayers (including mandataires) and electors of the parish. The Parish Assembly:
sets the annual domestic rate according to the budget proposed by the Connétable;
elects members of the municipality, including the Roads Committee, Roads Inspectors, Vingteniers, Constable's Officers;
recommends liquor licences to the licensing bench;
adopts road names;
authorises the Procureurs du Bien Public to enter into contracts in the name of the parish;
may discuss other matters as proposed by the Connétable, or at the written request of a number of members of the Assembly

Religion 

The religious heads of the parishes are the Rectors. The responsibilities of the Rector have changed over time, but they have at times: represented the Church and their parish in the States and presided over parish assemblies on religious matters. They were originally appointed by religious heads in mainland Normandy. However, since the alienation of the islands from the contiental church, the responsibility has laid with the Crown. Though, generally the Rector had to be local and have a degree.

The Rector is supported by two  (Churchwardens).

Jerriais nicknames 
There are a number of nicknames for residents of the various parishes:

 Grouville and St Clement - enfuntchi (the smoky ones, or dim-witted)
 St Brelade - carpéleuse (caterpillar)
 St Helier - clyichard (town-dweller, 'townie' is also used in Channel Island English)
 St John - nièr tchu (black backsides)
 St John, Trinity and St Martin - nordgien (northerner)
 St Mary - rouôlot, bourdélot (roller, dumpling)
 St Peter - ventre à baînis (limpet)
 St Ouen - gris ventre (grey belly)

See also
Parishes of Guernsey

References

External links